There are seventeen football federations in Spain. These organizations are the governing bodies (alongside the Royal Spanish Football Federation) of autonomous community football. Most of them have their own football team.

The 19 Football Federations are:

 Royal Andalusian Football Federation (Andalusia). Andalusia autonomous football team.
 Aragonese Football Federation (Aragon). Aragon official football team
 Royal Football Federation of the Principality of Asturias (Asturias). Asturias autonomous football team
 Balearic Islands Football Federation (Balearic Islands). Balearic Islands autonomous football team
 Basque Football Federation (Basque Country). Basque Country national football team
 Canary Islands Football Federation (Canary Islands). Canary Islands autonomous football team
 Cantabrian Football Federation (Cantabria). Cantabria autonomous football team
 Castile and León Football Federation (Castile and León). Castile and León autonomous football team
 Castilla–La Mancha Football Federation (Castile-La Mancha).
 Catalan Football Federation (Catalonia). Catalonia national football team
 Ceuta Football Federation (Ceuta).
 Extremaduran Football Federation (Extremadura). Extremadura autonomous football team
 Royal Galician Football Federation (Galicia). Galicia national football team
 Royal Madrid Football Federation (Community of Madrid). Madrid autonomous football team
 Royal Melillan Football Federation (Melilla).
 Region of Murcia Football Federation (Murcia). Region of Murcia autonomous football team
 Navarre Football Federation (Navarre). Navarre autonomous football team
 La Rioja Football Federation (La Rioja).
 Valencian Community Football Federation (Valencian Community). Valencian Community autonomous football team

Football in Spain by autonomous community
regional football federations
Spain